Gongchang is a town in and the county seat of Longxi County, in southeastern Gansu province, China.  it has six residential communities and 25 villages under its administration.

It was the administrative centre of the historic Gongchang prefecture, which was then part of Shaanxi.

See also 
 List of township-level divisions of Gansu

References 

Township-level divisions of Gansu
Dingxi